Jay Tischfield (born June 15, 1946) is MacMillan Distinguished Professor and the Founding Chair of the Department of Genetics at Rutgers University. He is also Professor of Pediatrics and Psychiatry at Rutgers. He is currently Director of the Human Genetics Institute of New Jersey.

He also is the CEO and scientific director of RUCDR Infinite Biologics® (formerly the Rutgers University Cell & DNA Repository), the largest university-based repository in the world that collects, processes and performs genomic assays on human samples. Tischfield has six U.S patents to his name.

Education and career
Professor Tischfield obtained his bachelor's degree in biology in 1967 at the City University of New York, Brooklyn College. He finished his master's degree in biology at Yale University in 1969, where he received his PhD in 1973.

At Yale, Tischfield worked on mapping human genes to chromosomes. He used mice-man somatic cell hybrids to determine which genes are located on which chromosomes. He identified the gene for indophenol oxidase in mammals.
Later, this gene was identified by researchers from Duke University as the gene coding for the enzyme superoxide dismutase, which is involved in Down syndrome and some cases of amyotrophic lateral sclerosis (ALS, also known as Lou Gehrig’s disease).

Professor Tischfield is a diplomate of the American Board of Medical Genetics in PhD Medical Genetics and Clinical Molecular Genetics.  He is a Founding Fellow of the American College of Medical Genetics.

Professor Tischfield’s research at Rutgers University focuses on the genetic basis of complex diseases that are caused by many genes, frequently in combination, and often triggered by environmental causes. Tischfield’s lab investigates Tourette disorder, alcohol addiction and dihydroxyadenine urolithiasis and cystinuria, kidney diseases characterized by severe kidney stones. The laboratory has developed knockout mouse models for both kidney stone diseases and is developing therapies.

Another research area is focused on loss of heterozygosity, a side effect of DNA-repair and recombination. Via this mechanism, tumor suppressor genes can be deactivated, leading to cancer.

Tischfield’s group uses population studies to find genes that are involved in diseases, using samples from the RUCDR Infinite Biologics. In the past, the RUCDR contributed samples to a research project concerning the genetic causes of progeria. This study revealed that progeria patients have a defect in the Lamin A gene on chromosome 1. The discovery led to a clinical drug trial with a farnesyl transferase inhibitor, that started in May 2007.

In recent years Tischfield's research has turned to the genetic basis neuropsychiatric disorders such as Autism, Tourette syndrome and Obsessive Compulsive Disorder, three disorders on which he has coauthored publications.

Professor Tischfield's role has extended from science to University and New Jersey State politics and in 2011 NJBIZ listed Tischfield as being the 85th most powerful person in New Jersey business because of his political influence.

Personal
Tischfield is married and has three sons, all involved in biological science research. The oldest, Max has his PhD and is Rutgers Univ. Neuroscience faculty, his middle son, Sam has his PhD in computational biology and is a Fellow at Memorial Sloan Kettering Cancer Center, while the youngest, David is MD-PhD and a resident at UPenn  Jay Tischfield is also a big fan of Donald Duck.
He took up scuba diving after watching Sea Hunt when he was 15, and as of 2006 he had gone diving in Hawaii, the Cayman Islands and elsewhere.

Awards
 Rutgers Board of Trustees Award for Excellence in Research (2011)
 Election as American Association for the Advancement of Science Fellow (2007)
 Duncan and Nancy MacMillan Endowed Chair in Genetics (1999-)
 Elliot Ossermann Award for Distinguished Service in Support of Cancer Research, Israel Cancer Research Fund (1994)
 Distinguished Alumnus Award and Medal, Brooklyn College of the City University of New York (1990)

References

1940s births
Living people
Brooklyn College alumni
Rutgers University faculty
Yale University alumni
Fellows of the American Association for the Advancement of Science
University of California, San Francisco alumni
Case Western Reserve University faculty
Indiana University faculty
University of Cincinnati faculty